Karl Maier (born 24 August 1957) is a former speedway rider who competed in speedway, Longtrack and Grasstrack Racing. He reached seventeen World Longtrack world championship Finals and took the top honors four times.

World Longtrack Championship

Finals
 1978  Mühldorf (7th) 17pts
 1979  Marianske Lazne (6th) 13pts
 1980  Scheeßel (Champion) 23pts
 1981  Radgona (13th) 5pts
 1982  Esbjerg (Champion) 24pts
 1983  Marianske Lazne (Third) 18pts
 1984  Herxheim (Third) 17pts
 1986  Herxheim (6th) 11pts
 1987  Mühldorf (Champion) 22pts
 1988  Scheeßel (Champion) 42pts
 1989  Marianske Lazne (Third) 33pts
 1990  Herxheim (Second) 30pts 1991  Marianske Lazne (7th) 10pts
 1992  Pfarrkirchen (Third) 20pts 1993  Mühldorf (Second) 20pts 1995  Scheeßel (6th) 14pts
 1996  Herxheim (6th) 11pts

Semi-finalist
 1985  Vilshofen (9th) 10pts
 1994  Scheeßel (4th) 20pts

World Final appearances

Individual World Championship
 1983 -  Norden, Motodrom Halbemond - 6th - 9+3pts
 1984 -  Gothenburg, Ullevi - 9th - 7pts
 1985 -  Bradford, Odsal Stadium - 16th - 1pt
 1986 -  Chorzów, Silesian Stadium - 13th - 3pts

World Pairs Championship
 1983 -  Gothenburg, Ullevi (with Egon Müller) - 6th - 12pts (6)
 1986 -  Pocking, Rottalstadion (with Klaus Lausch) - 6th - 27pts (22)
 1989 -  Leszno, Alfred Smoczyk Stadium (with Gerd Riss) - 4th - 36pts (22)

World Team Cup
 1981 -  Olching, Speedway Stadion Olching (with Egon Müller / Georg Hack / Georg Gilgenreiner) - 3rd - 28pts (8)
 1982 -  London, White City Stadium (with Georg Hack / Egon Müller / Alois Wiesböck / Georg Gilgenreiner) - 3rd''' - 18pts (7)

References

1965 births
German speedway riders
Living people
German expatriate sportspeople in Poland
Individual Speedway Long Track World Championship riders
Sportspeople from Munich
Belle Vue Aces riders
Birmingham Brummies riders